Roland Hahnebach is a retired East German slalom canoeist who competed in the early 1960s. He won two medals at the 1961 ICF Canoe Slalom World Championships in Hainsberg with a gold in the folding K-1 team event and a silver in the folding K-1 event.

References

German male canoeists
Possibly living people
Year of birth missing (living people)
Medalists at the ICF Canoe Slalom World Championships